Werewolf fiction denotes the portrayal of werewolves and other shapeshifting therianthropes, in the media of literature, drama, film, games and music. Werewolf literature includes folklore, legend, saga, fairy tales, Gothic and horror fiction, fantasy fiction and poetry. Such stories may be supernatural, symbolic or allegorical. A classic American cinematic example of the theme is The Wolf Man (1941) which in later films joins with the Frankenstein Monster and Count Dracula as one of the three famous icons of modern day horror. However, werewolf fiction is an exceptionally diverse genre, with ancient folkloric roots and manifold modern re-interpretations.

Literary origins

In Greek mythology, there is a story of an Arcadian King called Lycaon who tested Zeus by serving him a dish of his slaughtered and dismembered son to see if Zeus was really all-knowing. As punishment for his trickery, Zeus transformed Lycaon into a wolf and killed his 50 sons by lightning bolts, but supposedly revived Lycaon's son Nyctimus, who the king had slaughtered.

In medieval romances, such as Bisclavret, and Guillaume de Palerme the werewolf is relatively benign, appearing as the victim of evil magic and aiding knights errant.

However, in most legends influenced by medieval theology the werewolf was a Satanic beast with a craving for human flesh. This appears in such later fiction as "The White Wolf of the Hartz Mountains": an episode in the novel The Phantom Ship (1839) by Marryat, featuring a demonic femme fatale who transforms from woman to wolf.

Sexual themes are common in werewolf fiction; the protagonist kills his girlfriend as she walks with a former lover in Werewolf of London, suggesting sexual jealousy. The writers of The Wolf Man were careful in depicting killings as motivated out of hunger.

The wolf in the fairy tale "Little Red Riding Hood" has been reinterpreted as a werewolf in many works of fiction, such as The Company of Wolves (1979) by Angela Carter (and its 1984 film adaptation) and the film Ginger Snaps (2000), which address female sexuality. 2011 also saw the release of Red Riding Hood with Amanda Seyfried in the main role, with the character name of Valerie.

Folklore
In folk and fairy tale traditions all over the world, humans who can shapeshift at will into both human and lupine forms appear in several fairy tales. According to the Aarne-Thompson-Uther Index, they can appear in this capacity in the following tale types:

 Aarne-Thompson-Uther Index tale type ATU 409, : a tale type more commonly found in the folklore of Estonia and Finland, a human hunter finds a woman in the woods and hides her animal (wolf) skin. Years later, after the wolf-maiden has given birth to children, one of them finds her wolf skin and gives to her. She puts it back and disappears, never to return.
 Aarne-Thompson-Uther Index tale type ATU 425, "The Search for the Lost Husband" and ATU 425A, "The Animal Bridegroom": a maiden is betrothed to an animal bridegroom (a wolf, in several variants), who comes at night to the bridal bed in human form. The maiden breaks a taboo and her enchanted husband disappears. She is forced to search for him. Example: The White Wolf (fairy tale), Belgian fairy tale; Prince Wolf, Danish fairy tale.
 Aarne-Thompson-Uther Index tale type ATU 425C, "Beauty and the Beast": a father has three daughters, the youngest the most beautiful and the most loved by her parent. He needs to go on a journey and asks his daughter what presents should he bring them, the youngest suggest something simple, but very or nearly impossible to find. Near the end of his journey, he finds the wished-for object in the garden of a (seemingly) abandoned castle, when a booming voice interrupts him. The voice belongs to a fierce creature (sometimes explicitly described as a wolf by the narrative) who demands "his most precious gift" in return: the youngest daughter. She willingly offers herself to the beast and discovers he is an enchanted prince. She helps him break the curse and they both live happily ever after.
 Aarne-Thompson-Uther Index tale type ATU 552, "The Girls who married Animals": a bankrupt nobleman or a poor farmer is forced to wed his daughters to three animal suitors, who are actually enchanted princes under a curse. In some variants, one of the suitors is a wolf.

19th century

Nineteenth-century Gothic horror stories drew on previous folklore and legend to present the theme of the werewolf in a new fictional form. An early example is Hugues, the Wer-Wolf by Sutherland Menzies, published in 1838. The year after in 1839, Frederick Marryat's book The Phantom Ship was published, which included one of the first stories about a female werewolf, and is often reprinted as a stand-alone short story called The White Wolf of the Hartz Mountains. In another, Wagner the Wehr-Wolf (1847) by G. W. M. Reynolds, we find the classic subject of a man who, although a kind-hearted man himself, accepts a deal with the devil to become a werewolf for 18 months accompanying Dr. Faustus and killing humans, in exchange for youth and wealth. "The Man-Wolf" (1831) by Leitch Ritchie yields the werewolf in an 11th-century setting, while Catherine Crowe penned what is believed to be the first werewolf short story by a woman: "A Story of a Weir-Wolf" (1846). Other werewolf stories of this period include The Wolf Leader (1857) by Alexandre Dumas and Hugues-le-Loup (1869) by Erckmann-Chatrian.

A later Gothic story, Robert Louis Stevenson's Strange Case of Dr Jekyll and Mr Hyde (1886), has an implicit werewolf subtext, according to Colin Wilson. This has been made explicit in some recent adaptations of this story, such as the BBC TV series Jekyll (2007). Stevenson's Olalla (1887) offers more explicit werewolf content, but, like Strange Case of Dr Jekyll and Mr Hyde, this aspect remains subordinate to the story's larger themes.

Charles De Coster's 1867 novel The Legend of Thyl Ulenspiegel and Lamme Goedzak includes an extensive episode where the Flemish town of Damme is terrorized by what seems a rampaging werewolf, the numerous victims' bodies bearing what seems the mark of a wolf's fangs - thought ultimately they turn out to have been killed by a completely mundane serial killer, clever and ruthless, who used metal blades to simulate these wolf's tooth marks.

A rapacious female werewolf who appears in the guise of a seductive femme fatale before transforming into lupine form to devour her hapless male victims is the protagonist of Clemence Housman's acclaimed The Were-wolf published in 1896.

20th century

In literature
The 20th century saw an explosion of werewolf short stories and novels published in both England and America. The famed English supernatural story writer Algernon Blackwood wrote a number of werewolf short stories. These often had an occult aspect to them. English author Gerald Biss published the 1919 werewolf novel The Door of the Unreal. American pulp magazines of the 1920 to 1950s, such as Weird Tales, include many werewolf tales, written by such authors as H. Warner Munn, Seabury Quinn and Manly Wade Wellman. Robert E. Howard made his own contribution to the genre in "Wolfshead".

The most renowned werewolf novel of the 20th century was The Werewolf of Paris (1933) by American author Guy Endore. This novel has been accorded classic status and is considered by some to be the Dracula of werewolf literature. It was adapted as The Curse of the Werewolf in 1961 for Hammer Film Productions. The novel The Wolf's Bride: A Tale from Estonia written by the Finnish author Aino Kallas was published in 1928 and it tells the story of the forester's wife living in Hiiumaa in the 17th century who became a werewolf under the influence of a malevolent forest spirit. A more recent example is Moon of the Wolf (1967) by Les Whitten, which the 1972 movie of the same name, Moon of the Wolf, was based on.

In films
In cinema during the silent era, werewolves were portrayed in canine form in such films as The Werewolf (1913) and Wolf Blood (1925). The first feature film to portray an anthropomorphic werewolf was Werewolf of London in 1935 (not to be confused with the 1981 film of a similar title), establishing the canon that the werewolf always kills what he loves the most. The main werewolf of this film was a dapper London scientist who retained some of his style and most of his human features after his transformation.

However, he lacked warmth, and it was left to the tragic character Laurence Stewart "Larry" Talbot played by Lon Chaney Jr. in 1941's The Wolf Man to capture the public imagination. This catapulted the werewolf into public consciousness. The theme of lycanthropy as a disease or curse reached its standard treatment in the film, which contained the now-famous rhyme:

This movie draws on elements of traditional folklore and fiction, such as the vulnerability of the werewolf to a silver bullet (as seen for instance in the legend of Beast of Gévaudan), though at the climax of the film, the Wolf Man is actually dispatched with a silver-handled cane.

While the process of transmogrification is sometimes portrayed in such films and works of literature to be painful, other works omit this aspect in favor of a loss of consciousness during the change and even an inability to recall the event. Regardless, the resulting wolf is typically cunning but merciless, and prone to killing and eating people without compunction, regardless of the moral character of the person when human.

Lon Chaney Jr. himself became somewhat typecast as the Wolf Man and reprised his role in several sequels for Universal Studios. In these films, the werewolf lore of the first film was clarified. In Frankenstein Meets the Wolf Man (1943) it is firmly established that the Wolf Man is revived from the dead at a night of the full moon after his grave was disturbed. In House of Frankenstein (1944), silver bullets are used for the first time to dispatch him. Further sequels were House of Dracula (1945) and the parodic Abbott and Costello Meet Frankenstein (1948).

The success of Universal's The Wolf Man prompted rival Hollywood film companies Columbia Pictures and Fox Studios to bring out their own, now somewhat obscure, werewolf films. The first of these was The Undying Monster produced by Fox in 1942, adapted from a werewolf novel of the same name by Jessie Douglas Kerruish, published in 1936.

In 1981, two prominent werewolf films, The Howling and An American Werewolf in London, both drew on themes from the Universal series. While the werewolves in The Howling resembled bipedal wolves, the one in An American Werewolf in London had a more quadrupedal form with longer claws, a short tail, and finger-like structures on its front paws. The latter later had a follow-up called An American Werewolf in Paris.

Other interpretations
More recently, the portrayal of werewolves has taken a more sympathetic turn in some circles. With the rise of environmentalism and other back-to-nature ideals, the werewolf has come to be seen as a representation of humanity allied more closely with nature.

Despite the recent upsurge in the motif of heroic werewolves, unsympathetic portrayals of werewolves as monsters also continue to be common in popular culture. This is especially true in films, which are only slowly incorporating trends in written fiction. There are very few werewolf films outside the horror genre.

 Author Whitley Strieber previously explored these themes in his novels The Wolfen (1978), in which a (non-werewolf) species of intelligent wolf-like creatures are shown to act as predators of humanity, acting as a "natural" control on their population now that it has been removed from the traditional limits of nature, and The Wild (1991), in which the werewolf is portrayed as a medium through which to bring human intelligence and spirit back into nature. The heroic werewolf has also returned via the paranormal romance genre, where wolf-like characteristics such as loyalty are shown as positive traits in a prospective mate.
 Werewolves have featured a number of times in the long-running British science fiction television series Doctor Who and its other media tie-ins. The first time a werewolf appeared in the television series was in the Seventh Doctor serial The Greatest Show in the Galaxy (1988) during which the young punk girl Mags is shown to have aversion to moon signs and reacted in a violent, animalistic manner to various acts of violence throughout the story. In the cliffhanger to the third episode, she was seen to transform into a discoloured, ferocious, humanoid depiction of a lupine-like creature when a silvery-blue lighting effect is shone upon her during the climactic act in a circus ring. A wolf-man appears in the 1986 Sixth Doctor story Mindwarp, and the primords in the 1970 Third Doctor story Inferno are also lupine in appearance, but in both cases these are induced mutations rather than people who switched between human and wolf forms. A (more traditional) werewolf also appeared in the 2006 Tenth Doctor episode "Tooth and Claw".
 In the Harry Potter series (1997–2007), the most prominent werewolf is Remus Lupin, who is portrayed as struggling with his curse and terrified of infecting someone. The series also includes a werewolf villain Fenrir Greyback who fits more with the older image of werewolves and is a member of the Death Eaters. The Potter books, while showing the intense threat to humans transformed into bloodthirsty monsters pose to the population, essentially use werewolves as a metaphor for marginalized groups who have been discriminated against in modern society.
 Poul Anderson's Operation Chaos and its sequel Operation Luna have as their protagonist a completely positive and heroic werewolf, who is in complete control of transformation from human to wolf and back, and ultimately retains his normal mind while in wolf form - being thus able to use the wolf form to fight evil, in the manner of superheroes endowed with a superpower. An earlier Anderson novel, Three Hearts and Three Lions, with its semi-medieval settling, featured a more traditional werewolf - a young girl transformed against her will and in wolf form perpetrating acts which she does not remember when returning to human form. Even so, she is depicted sympathetically as a victim, and a solution is found by taking her far away from the influence of evil magic, to a location where she would not change again and where she could get happily married.
 Several werewolf characters have been featured in Terry Pratchett's Discworld series; the most prominent is Captain Angua von Überwald of the Ankh-Morpork City Watch. The Discworld series features a few werewolves that subvert expectations, including a character named Lupine who transforms into a human-like form every night of the full moon, but otherwise remains a wolf.
 In The Simpsons episode "Treehouse of Horror X", Ned Flanders turns into a werewolf and devours Homer.
 The book series Goosebumps featured an assortment of werewolves:
 The book The Werewolf of Fever Swamp featured Will Blake. Will Blake also appeared in the films Goosebumps and Goosebumps: Haunted Halloween.
 The book A Shocker on Shock Street featured Wolf Boy and Wolf Girl, who were from a horror movie franchise called Shock Street.
 The book Werewolf Skin reveals the titular item can turn its wearers into werewolves like it did with Alex Hunter's Aunt Mart and Uncle Colin.
 Give Yourself Goosebumps featured werewolves in Night in Werewolf Woods, The Werewolf of Twisted Tree Lodge, and All-Day Nightmare.
 The book The Werewolf in the Living Room features Ben Grantley who was responsible for biting Aaron Friedlus.
 The So Weird episode "Werewolf" featured a werewolf named Laura (portrayed by Chantal Conlin). Her werewolf form was not seen except for some glowing red eyes in the dark. At a young age, she was left on the doorstep of bed-and-breakfast owners Carl and Judy (portrayed by Greg Michaels and Merilynn Gann). When a beast was attacking their chickens, they are unaware that it's Laura's werewolf form. When her family visits this bed-and-breakfast, Fiona "Fi" Phillips befriends Laura. Fi later learns the truth and Laura admits that she can't control her werewolf form which also explains why she has to sneak out at night and was found napping a lot. By the end of the episode, it is implied that Carl and Judy learned of her condition and persuaded their neighbors to be supportive of them.
 In the Animorphs series, the characters can also morph into wolves.
 A very popular modern subgenre consists of stories that treat werewolves as a separate race or species (either science fictional or magical) or as persons using magic in order to deliberately transform into wolves at will. Such current-day werewolf fiction almost exclusively involves lycanthropy being either a hereditary condition or being transmitted like a disease by the bite of another werewolf. The form a werewolf takes is not always an ordinary wolf, but is often anthropomorphic or may be otherwise larger and more powerful than an ordinary wolf. Sometimes the beast form of the werewolf will have some physical characteristics borrowed from an animal species other than the wolf, as can be seen in the boar-like werewolf of the film Wild Country (2005). Many modern werewolves are also supposedly immune to damage caused by ordinary weapons, being vulnerable only to silver objects (usually a bullet or blade). This negative reaction to silver is sometimes so strong that the mere touch of the metal on a werewolf's skin will cause burns.
 The film Ginger Snaps, Ginger Snaps 2: Unleashed, and Ginger Snaps Back: The Beginning featured werewolves. While the werewolf in the first film was depicted as a larger and nearly hairless wolf, the werewolves in the latter had more fur on them. Ginger Fitzgerald (portrayed by Katharine Isabelle) and Brigitte Fitzgerald (portrayed by Emily Perkins) are known werewolves in this franchise.
 In the movie War Wolves, recently shown on the Sci-Fi channel, lycanthropy does not have an influence on the "victims'" alignment. Instead, it is up to the individual to choose whether to use their abilities for good or evil. Both the heroes and villains in the movie are werewolves from the same military unit.
 The climatic scene of the film Dark Shadows revealed that Carolyn Stoddart (portrayed by Chloë Grace Moretz) is a werewolf. This depiction shows her almost similar to Larry Talbot, but with more wolf-like legs. It was revealed by the witch Angelique Bouchard (portrayed by Eva Green) that she sent a werewolf to bite Carolyn while she was an infant.
 In the TV series Creepshow, there is a story called "Bad Wolf Down" where outnumbered soldiers gain the ability to become werewolves to take out their Nazi pursuers after befriending a locked-up woman who is a werewolf. There is also a Christmas special that is an adaption of the book Shapeshifters Anonymous where the main character turns out to be a werewolf.

In games
In the online MMO game Fer.al, one of the playable avatars the player can unlock is a werewolf, which was previously a Season Pass exclusive.

See also
List of werewolves
Werewoman

References

Further reading
Black, George Fraser. A List of Works Relating to Lycanthropy. New York: New York Public Library Publications, 1919. (earliest published list of werewolf fiction)
Du Coudray, Chantal Bourgault. The Curse of the Werewolf. London : I. B. Tauris, 2006.  (book on literary symbolism of the werewolf)
Flores, Nona C. Animals in the Middle Ages: A Book of Essays. New York: Garland, 1996.  (contains learned commentary on William of Palerne)
Frost, Brian J. The Essential Guide to Werewolf Literature. Madison: University of Wisconsin Press 2003.  (contains long lists of novels and short stories, especially pre-1970s ones, with excerpts)
Steiger, Brad. The Werewolf Book: The Encyclopedia of Shapeshifting Beings. Visible Ink Press, 1999.  (contains long list of films, medium-sized list of novels)

Werewolf fiction
Lists of fantasy books
Film genres
Horror genres